The orange-bellied burrowing skink (Simiscincus aurantiacus) is a skink. It is monotypic in the genus Simiscincus.  It is endemic to New Caledonia.

References

Skinks of New Caledonia
Lizard genera
Reptiles described in 1997
Taxa named by Ross Allen Sadlier
Taxa named by Aaron M. Bauer